Vera Johnson (1920 – November 9, 2007) was a Vancouver folk singer who started provided political commentary on current events from 1949. She was famous for creating original songs on almost any topic: religion, sex, divorce, censorship, liberation, politics and family. Her song, "The Fountain", described the "hippie protests" of 1968 Vancouver.

According to her autobiographical essay, Johnson was born in 1920 and learned to sing and play music in 1949. She always viewed her music (in addition to her play and short-story writing) as a means for political change.

Discography
 Bald Eagle (1974) - live album
The Bald Eagle
Homer Johnson
Oh Canada
You Can't Let Your Hair Hang Down
A Song for Michael
The Do-It-Yourself Divorce
Pierre Trudeau
The Word
Jesus Was a Preacher
Layabouts
The Gentle Rain of England
That Minx from Pinsk
 That's What I Believe (1978) - live album 
The Oldest Swinger in Town
The Fountain
The Indian
The Queerest Critter
Coming Home
The Sweetheart of Sordido V
Women's Liberation Blues
God's not Dead
Thomas Arkinstall
Mrs. Ballantyne
Nagamma
That's What I Believe

External links
 Vera Johnson biography

Canadian women folk singers
1920 births
2007 deaths
20th-century Canadian women singers